Events from the year 1597 in Ireland.

Incumbent
Monarch: Elizabeth I

Events
March 11 – Dublin Gunpowder Disaster: Huge explosion on the Dublin quays as barrels of gunpowder are unloaded; 126 killed, many more injured, and as many as forty houses demolished.
November – Battle of Carrickfergus: The clan MacDonnell of Antrim led by Sorley Boy MacDonnell defeat the English.

Deaths
 July 29 – Murrough O'Brien, 4th Baron Inchiquin, soldier (b. 1562)
 August 3 – Richard Meredith, Church of Ireland Bishop of Leighlin
 October 14 – Thomas Burgh, 3rd Baron Burgh, Lord Deputy of Ireland since 18 April (b. c.1558)
 Henry FitzGerald, 12th Earl of Kildare, soldier (b. 1562) (died of wounds)
 Fiach McHugh O'Byrne, clan chief (b. 1534)

References

 
1590s in Ireland
Ireland
Years of the 16th century in Ireland